Henry William James Charsley (born 1 November 1996) is an English-born Irish professional footballer who plays as a midfielder for  club Newport County. He was born in Wirral, England, but represented the Republic of Ireland up to under-21 level.

Charsley came through the Academy at Everton and turned professional at the club in July 2014. He helped the youth-team to win two Premier League 2 titles. He appeared in one first-team game in the Europa League in December 2017 and also featured in one game on loan at Championship club Bolton Wanderers the following month. He signed with Mansfield Town in January 2020 and made 77 appearances during a two-year stay, before moving on to Port Vale for an undisclosed fee. He helped the club to win promotion out of League Two via the play-offs in 2022, though struggled for gametime in League One and moved on to Newport County in January 2023.

Club career

Everton
Charsley joined the Academy at Everton at the age of nine. He was part of the squad that won the Under-18 Premier League title in the 2013–14 season and scored the only goal of the game against Manchester City in the knockout final at Goodison Park. After progressing through the ranks of the Academy, he signed his first professional two-year contract with the club in July 2014. Charsley was named as Everton Under-18s Player of the Season and won the team's Goal of the Season award. In July 2016, he signed a one-year contract extension with the club. He scored three goals in his first five matches for the under-23 side in the 2016–17 season. He scored on his debut against a senior team in a competitive game on 8 November 2016, in 1–1 draw with Blackpool in the EFL Trophy, which ended in a 5–4 defeat in the penalty shoot-out. He top-scored with 12 goals in 23 games to help David Unsworth's under-23 team to win the 2016–17 Premier League 2 title. In April 2017, Charsley signed a two-year contract extension.

On 7 December 2017, Charsley made his first-team debut under Sam Allardyce, starting in a 3–0 win at Apollon Limassol in the Europa League. Local newspaper, the Daily Post, said that he "grew in confidence at left-back." He played nine further games for the under-23s in the EFL Trophy, but would never make another first-team appearance. On 12 January 2018, Charsley moved to Championship side Bolton Wanderers on loan until the end of the 2017–18 season, joining Everton compatriot Antonee Robinson at the Macron Stadium. Charsley made his Bolton Wanderers debut the following day in a 2–0 loss against Brentford, where he started the match before coming off as a substitute in the second-half after playing 55 minutes. Manager Phil Parkinson said: "It didn't quite drop for him but there were a lot of good things." This was the only game Charsley played before returning to Everton. He played every game of the under-23's 2018–19 Premier League 2 title win. In June 2019, it was announced that Charsley would be released by Everton when his contract expired at the end of the month. Despite this, Charsley was given a new short-term contract until January 2020 a gesture of good will after he was sidelined with a spinal injury. Having returned to fitness, he played a further 14 times for the youth-team before his short-term contract expired and he left the "Toffees" for good after 15 years.

Mansfield Town
On 17 January 2020, Charlsey joined League Two club Mansfield Town on a deal until the end of the season. He featured nine times in the second half of the 2019–20 season, which was ended early due to the COVID-19 pandemic in England with Graham Coughlan's side finishing in 21st-place on points per game. On 5 February 2021, Charsley signed a new 18-month contract with the club. He made 48 appearances in the 2020–21 campaign, scoring five goals, as Mansfield posted a 16th-place finish. On 15 January 2022, he scored both goals in a 2–0 victory over Walsall.

In total he scored seven goals and provided eight assists in 77 appearances for the "Stags". Reflecting on the decision to let him leave the club, manager Nigel Clough said that "it would have been very, very selfish" to insist that he stay at Field Mill when he could not guarantee him much playing time.

Port Vale
On 28 January 2022, Charlsey joined League Two side Port Vale for an undisclosed fee. Manager Darrell Clarke had looked to strengthen the midfield department after injuries to Tom Conlon and Jake Taylor. Charlsey was part of a midfield three of Tom Pett and Ben Garrity that helped the "Valiants" to put together a winning run in March. He scored his first goal for the "Valiants" on 5 April, to secure a 1–0 victory at Salford City. He played as a substitute in the play-off final at Wembley Stadium as Vale secured promotion with a 3–0 victory over Mansfield Town; Michael Baggaley of The Sentinel wrote that "[Charsley put in] a typically dynamic performance against his old club". He made ten appearances in the first half of the 2022–23 season, but left the club by mutual consent in January 2023 after securing a deal elsewhere;director of football David Flitcroft said that "Harry's ability in training has been high, but due to the competition in front of him the minutes on the pitch haven't been available".

Newport County
On 17 January 2023, Charsley joined League Two club Newport County on an 18-month contract; the move reunited him with Graham Coughlan, his former manager at Mansfield. He made his debut at Rodney Parade in a 2–1 win over Swindon Town on 4 February. He scored his first goal for Newport in a 2–1 defeat at Salford City on 4 March.

International career
Charsley was born on the Wirral in England, but is eligible to represent the Republic of Ireland as his mother is from County Offaly. He played for the Republic of Ireland at various age levels, from under-17 level to under-21 level. After representing the under-17s in 2013, Charsley was called up to the under-19s to make his debut on 9 September 2014, in a 1–0 win over Netherlands U19. After previously being called up by under-21s in June 2015, Charsley was called up for a second time in late-August. He scored his first goal for the under-21s in a 2–1 win over Slovenia U21 on 2 September. A year later, on 9 October 2017, he scored his second goal for the under-21s in a 4–0 win over Israel U21.

Style of play
Charsley is a versatile player who is best utilised in any of the attacking midfield positions. He has good energy and technical skills.

Career statistics

Honours
Everton U23
Premier League 2: 2016–17, 2018–19

Port Vale
EFL League Two play-offs: 2022

References 

1996 births
Living people
Sportspeople from Wirral
English people of Irish descent
English footballers
Republic of Ireland association footballers
Republic of Ireland youth international footballers
Republic of Ireland under-21 international footballers
Association football midfielders
Everton F.C. players
Bolton Wanderers F.C. players
Mansfield Town F.C. players
Port Vale F.C. players
Newport County A.F.C. players
English Football League players